The 2017 World Draughts Championship (in rapid and blitz) at the international draughts was held between 6–10 May 2017, in Izmir, Turkey, by International Draughts Federation (FMJD).

2017 Rapid World Draughts Championship
The rapid games were played on 7 May 2017 in swiss system, 9 rounds in total with a time control of 15 minutes plus 5 seconds per move, 19 players.

Results (19 players)
 1.  Artem Ivanov – 13 pts,
 2.  Alexander Getmanski – 11,
 3.  Alexander Georgiev – 11,
 4.  Alexander Schwartzman – 11,
 5.  Guntis Valneris – 11,
 6.  Denis Shkatula – 11...

2017 Blitz World Draughts Championship
The blitz games were played between 8–9 May 2017 in round-robin system, 21 round in total with a time control of 5 minutes plus 3 seconds per move. 21 players were competing in the tournament, and Jean Marc Ndjofang of Cameroon became World Draughts Champion in blitz.

References

External links
 Official website
Rapid
 Results on Kabeliit.ee
 WC Rapid Izmir Turkey 2017 (Rapid)
Blitz
 Results on Kabeliit.ee
 Cross table
 WC Blitz Izmir Turkey 2017 (Blitz)

2017 in draughts
Draughts world championships
Sports competitions in Izmir
World Draughts
International sports competitions hosted by Turkey
May 2017 sports events in Turkey
2010s in İzmir